Sexing the Body: Gender Politics and the Construction of Sexuality is a 2000 book by the biologist Anne Fausto-Sterling, in which the author explores the social construction of gender, and the social and medical treatment of intersex people. Her stated goal is to "convince readers of the need for theories that allow for a good deal of human variation and that integrate the analytical powers of the biological and the social into the systematic analysis of human development."

Background
This book was published in the same year as As Nature Made Him, a book by John Colapinto about David Reimer that further debunked the gender theories of John Money. The examination and critique in Sexing the Body of the theories advanced by Money therefore lack the additional details uncovered by Colapinto.

Critical reception
In a review for Politics and the Life Sciences, Laurette T. Liesen writes the book is "based on the premise that science is a social construction in which "created truths" about sex and gender are imposed on individuals" and "In a rather circular argument, Fausto-Sterling describes how studies on sexual differences in genetics, hormones, and the brain, as well as medical practices used on intersexuals, are gender-biased." A review in Hypatia by Heidi E. Grasswick notes that Fausto-Sterling uses the metaphor of a möbius strip "in an effort to describe not only the organization of the book, but more importantly, the complex nature of the relationship between the social and the material that she is striving to articulate through her detailed analyses of particular research programs." 

According to Publishers Weekly, "As in her now classic book, Myths of Gender, Fausto-Sterling draws on a wealth of scientific and medical information, along with social, anthropological and feminist theory, to make the case that "choosing which criteria to use in determining sex, and choosing to make the determination at all, are social decisions for which scientists can offer no absolute guidelines."" In a review for Isis, Stephanie H. Kenen writes, "Despite its accessible appeal and riveting subject matter, Sexing the Body will likely be disappointing to the specialized audience that reads
Isis. It is a popular book intended to introduce a nonscientific lay audience to the conceptual messiness of contemporary sex difference research."

Notes

References 
Fausto-Sterling, Anne (2000).  Sexing the Body: Gender Politics and Construction of Sexuality.  New York: Basic Books.

2000 non-fiction books
Basic Books books
Books about social constructionism
Books about the philosophy of sexuality
Books by Anne Fausto-Sterling
English-language books
Intersex and medicine
Intersex in non-fiction
Medical controversies
Medical ethics
Social problems in medicine
Transgender non-fiction books
Gender studies books